PKE may refer to:

 Park Electrochemical Corporation, a global advanced materials company
 Palm kernel, the edible seed of the oil palm tree
 a code of the Parkes Airport
 Południowy Koncern Energetyczny, a Polish power company
 Post-Keynesian economics, a school of economic thought
 Public Key Encryption, from asymmetrical cryptography
 Presidents and Key Executives MBA, a degree granted by Pepperdine University